Aksel Sandemose (né Axel Nielsen; 19 March 1899 – 6 August 1965) was a Danish-Norwegian writer whose works frequently elucidate the theme that the repressions of society lead to violence.

Biography
Axel Nielsen was born at Nykøbing Mors on the island of Mors in Denmark. His parents were Jørgen Nielsen (1859–1928) and Amalie Jacobsdatter (1861–1926). His father was a factory foreman. He was the second youngest of nine children. He attended Staby vinterlærerskole 1915–1916. His mother was originally from Sandermosen at Maridalen in Aker, Norway. He changed his surname to Sandemose in 1921.

Sandemose boarded a schooner for Norway at the age of seventeen. He was a sailor and lumberjack in Newfoundland. 
He worked as a teacher at Nykøbing in 1916 and at Glyngøre in Skive during 1917. In 1930, Sandemose moved to Norway, and lived in Nesodden south of Oslo. After the Nazi German occupation of Norway during World War II, he fled to Sweden in 1941 due to his peripheral association with the Norwegian resistance movement. After the liberation of Norway, he moved back and settled in Søndeled.

Sandemose published his first book in Denmark during 1923. His most notable work was En flyktning krysser sitt spor (1933). The novel was translated into English and published under the title A Fugitive Crosses His Tracks in 1936 by Alfred A. Knopf. In this novel, Sandemose introduced the concept of the Law of Jante, a listing of ten cultural rules which describe a pattern of group behaviour towards individuals common to Nordic countries.

He was also an essayist and journalist. For a number of years he had a regular column in the weekly magazine Aktuell. Sandemose was awarded the Dobloug Prize during 1959 and was one of six finalists for the Nobel Prize in Literature in 1963.

Personal life
Sandemose first married in 1921 Dagmar Ditlevsen (1896–1984); their marriage was dissolved in 1944. In 1944 Eva Borgen (1906–1959) and he married. As a widower, his marriage with Hanne Holbek began in 1962. Sandemose fathered five children over his lifetime. 
He was the grandfather of illustrator and children's writer Iben Sandemose. Sandemose died in Copenhagen in 1965 and was buried at Vestre gravlund in Oslo.

Bibliography
1923 Fortællinger fra Labrador
1924 Ungdomssynd
1924 Mænd fra Atlanten
1924 Storme ved jævndøgn
1927 Klabavtermanden
1928 Ross Dane
1931 En sjømann går i land
1932 Klabautermannen
1933 En flyktning krysser sitt spor
1936 Vi pynter oss med horn
1939 September
1945 Tjærehandleren
1946 Det svundne er en drøm
1949 Alice Atkinson og hennes elskere
1950 En palmegrønn øy
1954 Rejsen til Kjørkelvik
1958 Varulven
1960 Murene rundt Jeriko
1961 Felicias bryllup
1963 Mytteriet på barken Zuidersee

References

Other sources
Steen Andersen (2015)  Nye forbindelser. Pejlinger i Aksel Sandemoses forfatterskab   (Vordingborg: Attika) 
Christopher S. Hale (2005) Aksel Sandemose and Canada: A Scandinavian Writer's Perception of the Canadian Prairies in the 1920s  (Regina, Saskatchewan: Canadian Plains Research Center)

External links
 Aksel Sandemose Selskabets website

1899 births
1965 deaths
People from Morsø Municipality
People from Nesodden
Danish educators
Norwegian columnists
Norwegian essayists
Norwegian resistance members
Danish male novelists
Norwegian male novelists
20th-century Norwegian male writers
20th-century Norwegian novelists
20th-century Danish novelists
Dobloug Prize winners
Burials at Vestre gravlund
20th-century essayists
20th-century Norwegian journalists